The Climate and Ecology Bill, formerly promoted under the name Climate and Ecological Emergency Bill, is a private member's bill before the Parliament of the United Kingdom aimed at tackling the climate crisis and environmental disaster. 

First introduced in the House of Commons in the 2019-21 session—and currently before the House of Lords in the 2022-23 session—the bill would ensure that the UK Government:

 reduce its greenhouse gas emissions in line with the remaining global carbon budget for 1.5°C
 reverses the damage to the natural world by 2030
 establishes a climate and nature (citizens') assembly to recommend measures for inclusion in an all-of-government strategy.

In the Commons, the bill has been presented twice by (Green MP and former Green Party leader) Caroline Lucas. In the 2019-21 session, the first reading of the CE Bill (172, 2019-20) took place on 2 September 2020.

In the 2021-22 session the CE Bill (61, 2021-22) had its first reading on 21 June 2021. A second reading debate was scheduled for 6 May 2022—but the bill was not allocated time to proceed.

In the 2022-23 session, the CE Bill (HL 13) was introduced in the House of Lords by (Lib Dem peer and former Lib Dem Lords energy spokesperson) Lord Redesdale. Its first reading took place on 21 May and its second reading on 15 July. Its committee stage is scheduled for 18 November.

Details
The bill would "require the Secretary of State to achieve climate and nature targets for the UK; to give the Secretary of State a duty to implement a strategy to achieve those targets; to establish a climate and nature assembly to advise the Secretary of State in creating that strategy; [and] to give duties to the Committee on Climate Change and the Joint Nature Conservation Committee regarding the strategy and targets."

It would establish a representative climate and nature assembly to propose recommendations in line with the proposed legislation's dual targets to tackle the climate and ecological emergency.

John Harris wrote in The Guardian that:The bill is a neat means of doing two things. It highlights how much our politicians are defying the urgency of the moment and—by presenting clear and precise proposals to drastically reduce carbon emissions and restore biodiversity in the same typefaces and official vocabulary as the laws that define whole swathes of our lives—it makes the prospect of radical action eminently imaginable.

History
In the 2019-21 session, Caroline Lucas MP tabled the bill—and corresponding early day motion 832—on 2 September 2020. It received its first reading the same day and its scheduled second reading date of 26 March 2021 was postponed.

11 MPs co-sponsored the bill—Alan Brown (SNP), Claire Hanna (Social Democratic and Labour Party), Wera Hobhouse (Liberal Democrat), Clive Lewis (Labour), Liz Saville Roberts (Plaid Cymru), Stephen Farry (Alliance), Ben Lake (Plaid Cymru), Tommy Sheppard (SNP), Alex Sobel (Labour/Co-op), Zarah Sultana (Labour) and Nadia Whittome (Labour). 

In the 2021-22 session, Caroline Lucas tabled the bill on 21 June 2021 with the support of 11 co-sponsors—Alan Brown (SNP), Ed Davey (Liberal Democrat), Stephen Farry (Alliance), Barry Gardiner (Labour), Claire Hanna (Social Democratic and Labour Party), Ben Lake (Plaid Cymru), Clive Lewis (Labour), Brendan O'Hara (SNP), Sarah Olney (Liberal Democrat), Liz Saville Roberts (Plaid Cymru) and Alex Sobel (Labour/Co-op).

During that session, the bill was scheduled for a second reading debate on four occasions—10 September 2021, 29 October 2021, 10 December 2021 and 6 May 2022.

For the 2022-23 session, the CE Bill was entered in the House of Lords new session private members' bill ballot by (Lib Dem peer) Lord Redesdale. It was drawn 8 of 25 bills. Its first reading took place on 21 May 2022 and its second reading on 15 July 2022. At its second reading, a cross-party group of peers spoke in favour, including Baroness Hooper (Conservative), Baroness Boycott (Crossbench), the Bishop of St Albans, (Lib Dems) Lord Teverson and Lord Oates and (Green) Baroness Bennett. Its committee stage is scheduled for 21 October.

Campaign 
Zero Hour (formerly, the CEE Bill Alliance) is a 25,000 person-strong grassroots organisation working to build support for the bill by persuading MPs, peers, mayors, councillors, local authorities, electoral candidates and political parties—as well as businesses, unions, community groups, NGOs, charities, cooperatives, and media organisations—to endorse the proposed legislation.

Zero Hour's allies (or partners) include The Wildlife Trusts, Women's Institutes of Northern Ireland, Surfers Against Sewage, UK Youth Climate Coalition, National Education Union, The Co-operative Bank, Oxfam, The Body Shop and Triodos Bank. The bill is also supported by environmental groups, Greenpeace, Friends of the Earth and Extinction Rebellion.

At the time of the bill's second reading in the House of Lords, 33 Peers, 121 MPs (from 10 political parties)—including senior Westminster figures, Kirsten Oswald (SNP), Ed Davey, Liz Saville Roberts, Colum Eastwood, Stephen Farry and Caroline Lucas—plus 198 local authorities and the London Assembly were backing the bill. 

At a regional level, on 2 December 2021, the London Assembly passed a cross-party motion to back the CE Bill—proposed by Zack Polanski AM (Green). The Mayor of London, Sadiq Khan, subsequently confirmed his support on 15 July 2022.

The Alliance Party, Green Party, Liberal Democrats, Plaid Cymru, SDLP and Yorkshire Party officially support the proposed legislation—and MPs from Labour and the Cooperative Party, the SNP and the DUP are also listed as bill supporters. The youth wings of several political parties are also behind the campaign, including Alliance Youth, Plaid Ifanc and Young Greens.

Senior Conservative peers, Baroness Verma and Baroness Hooper support of the bill. Conservative MP, Laurence Robertson, stated that he "supports the aims and principles of the bill" on 15 June 2022. Conservative MP and Father of the House—Sir Peter Bottomley—stated on 15 July 2022 that he "looks forward to supporting the bill when it returns to the Commons following the summer recess" and the Scottish Conservatives' leader, Douglas Ross MP, has said he will consider signing the bill when it comes to the Commons for a vote." on 26 August 2022.

See also
Climate change in the United Kingdom
Private Members' Bills in the Parliament of the United Kingdom
UK Climate Assembly
Environment Bill

References

External links
Campaign for the Climate and Ecological Emergency Bill
Climate and Ecology Bill 2019-21 at the Parliament of the United Kingdom

2020 in British law
Proposed laws of the United Kingdom
Climate change law
Climate change policy in the United Kingdom
Environmental law in the United Kingdom
2020 in the environment